WVR may refer to:

Railways
 The Willamette Valley Railway in Oregon, USA
 The Wye Valley Railway in Gloucestershire and Monmouthshire, UK

Information technology
 IBM Websphere Voice Response, an enterprise IVR platform

Other uses
 The Women's Emergency Corps, which became the Women's Volunteer Reserve
 Water Vapor Regain (%WVR), the mass of water (%WbV) reabsorbed by a material after being re-exposed to 50% RH at 23°C for 24 hours
 Weighted voting rights (WVR) structure, public companies' share structure, which enables certain share holders (typically called A-share) to have greater voting power in general meetings.